Vardges Sureniants (27 February 1860 – 6 April 1921) was an Armenian painter, sculptor, illustrator, translator, art critic, and theater artist. He is considered the founder of Armenian historical painting. His paintings feature scenes from Armenian fairy-tales and various historical events. Although Sureniants had only one exhibition dedicated to his works in his lifetime, he was admired by many of his contemporaries who include many well-known figures in Armenian and Russian society such as Martiros Saryan, Ilya Repin, and Vladimir Stasov.

Life

Vardges Sureniants was born in Akhaltsikhe, Russian Empire in modern-day Georgia on 27 February 1860. His father, Hakop Sureniants, was a priest and taught religious history. The Sureniants family moved to Simferopol in 1868. Sureniants' father was then appointed a presbyter to the Armenian diocese in Moscow. When in Moscow, Sureniants had an opportunity to study at the prestigious Armenian Lazarian School located in the city. In 1876, he furthered his education at the Moscow School of Painting, Sculpture and Architecture where he graduated in 1879. That same year Sureniants went to Munich, Germany, where he studied architecture at the Academy of Fine Arts, receiving more education in painting and ultimately graduating from the academy in 1885.

He traveled to Italy in 1881 and visited the island of San Lazzaro degli Armeni where the Armenian Catholic congregation of the Mechitarists is located. In their library he studied Armenian fine art and Armenian manuscripts. He created portraits of Mikayel Chamchian and others. In 1883, he wrote his first article which was published in the Armenian newspaper Meghu Hayastani entitled "A Few Words about Armenian Architecture". In 1885–87, he traveled to the Persian cities of Tabriz, Tehran, Isfahan and Shiraz with Russian orientalist Valentin Zhukovski's expedition. After his travels, Sureniants translated William Shakespeare's Richard III and sent it to Constantinople so that actor Bedros Adamian could have it produced. In 1890–91 he taught art history at the Gevorkian Seminary in Armenia.

In 1892 Sureniants visited Ani, Lake Sevan and became familiar with the everyday customs of rural Armenian life. In the same year, he went to Moscow where he became involved in many artistic circles. In 1901 an exhibition of his works was held in Baku. This was to be Sureniants' only exhibition in his lifetime. In 1901–02 he sculpted a bust of the Russian Armenian painter Ivan Aivazovsky.

During the Armenian genocide, Sureniants painted many paintings of survivors who found refuge in Russian Armenia. In 1916 he went to Tiflis, where he and other artists such as Mardiros Saryan and Panos Terlemezian founded the Armenian Artistic Society.

In 1917 Sureniants moved to Yalta where he was commissioned to draw the decorations for the newly built Armenian cathedral. Sureniants decorated the altar, walls, and dome of the church. While decorating the church Surentiants suffered a grave illness. He died on 6 April 1921, and is buried in the premises of the Armenian church of Yalta.

Work and style

In his early career as an artist, Sureniants became interested in caricatures and sketches during his study at the Lazarian School. While in Munich, Sureniants also worked at painting and line drawing. Some of his caricatures were published in the Fliegende Blätter magazine. He was also known for his illustrations of famous literary works, including Ferdowsi's Shahname, Alexander Pushkin's The Fountain of Bakhchisaray, the fairy tales of Oscar Wilde and works by the Belgian poet Georges Rodenbach, the Armenian writer Smbat Shahaziz and Alexander Tsaturyan.

Sureniants is often categorized as a realist painter. He once said that "painters must paint life the way it appears in front of our eyes." His style reflected this notion through his depiction of landscapes and historical events. He played an instrumental role in reviving Armenian historical events through the medium of art. Pointillism was one of his chief techniques.

Legacy
Despite his success as a painter, Sureniants had only one exhibition in his lifetime. However, there have been many posthumous exhibitions in his honor, including exhibitions at Venice (1924), Yerevan (1931, 1941, 1960, 2010) and elsewhere. The most recent exhibition was held in 2010 in honor of Sureniants' 150th anniversary. During the exhibition, the Prime Minister of Armenia, Tigran Sargsyan, said that:

Sureniants was well known in the art community and enjoyed personal friendships with a number of famous Russian artists including Igor Grabar, Vasily Polenov, Aleksandr Golovin and the sculptors Alexander Matveyev and Nikolay Andreyev.

One admirer of his was the Russian painter Ilya Repin, who said:

Another admirer was the Russian art critic Vladimir Stasov, who said: 

The Armenian painter Martiros Saryan once said of Sureniants that, "with a broad understanding of culture, his best works contained the beating heart of the Armenian nation" and added, "It is therefore certain that Sureniants will last as long as the Armenian people shall last."

Gallery

Notes

References

External links

1860 births
1921 deaths
People from Akhaltsikhe
Armenian portrait painters
Armenian translators
Armenian male writers
19th-century Armenian painters
20th-century Armenian painters
20th-century male writers
20th-century translators
Moscow School of Painting, Sculpture and Architecture alumni